Matt Winer  is an American television personality who is currently working for Turner Sports.

Career
Turner Sports signed Winer in 2010 to contribute to coverage of sports across its networks. He became the primary studio host for Major League Baseball on TBS, replacing Ernie Johnson Jr., who moved into a play-by-play role. He is also a studio host on NBA TV, and contributes to TNT's coverage of NASCAR, NBA, and the PGA Tour. He is one of the studio hosts for College Basketball on CBS.

Winer worked for ESPN from 2001 through 2009 He was often seen as an anchor on ESPNEWS and the 6:00 pm ET edition of SportsCenter, or as a host of NBA Fastbreak and College Football Scoreboard. He also hosted the SportsCenter 30 at 30 Update during Saturday Night Football and game updates during ABC's coverage of college football.

Prior to ESPN, Winer worked at four different television stations: KSDK-TV in St. Louis, Missouri, WOOD-TV in Grand Rapids, Michigan, WJTV-TV in Jackson, Mississippi, and KTVQ-TV in Billings, Montana.

Education

Winer is a graduate of the University of Missouri and was a member of the Pi Kappa Alpha fraternity. He has been nominated for four regional sports Emmys.

References

External links
Turner Sports bio'

Major League Baseball broadcasters
National Basketball Association broadcasters
College basketball announcers in the United States
Living people
American television sports announcers
American sports journalists
Missouri School of Journalism alumni
People from Billings, Montana
College football announcers
American broadcasters
20th-century American journalists
American male journalists
Year of birth missing (living people)